Actors Theater may refer to:

 Actors Theatre of Louisville, a non-profit performing arts theater located in downtown Louisville, Kentucky
 Actors' Theatre of Columbus, a performing arts theater troupe located in Columbus, Ohio